Edwin Eliason (born May 1, 1938) is an American archer. He competed in the men's individual event at the 1972 Summer Olympics.

References

1938 births
Living people
American male archers
Olympic archers of the United States
Archers at the 1972 Summer Olympics
People from Kitsap County, Washington
Pan American Games medalists in archery
Pan American Games gold medalists for the United States
Pan American Games silver medalists for the United States
Pan American Games bronze medalists for the United States
Archers at the 1983 Pan American Games
Archers at the 1991 Pan American Games
Archers at the 1995 Pan American Games
Medalists at the 1983 Pan American Games
Medalists at the 1991 Pan American Games
Medalists at the 1995 Pan American Games